This is a list of hospitals in North America for each sovereign country. territory, and dependency.

Sovereign states
The following list contains the links to lists of hospitals and the category hospitals in each sovereign state of North America, along with the current number of articles in each category.
List of hospitals in Antigua and Barbuda
List of hospitals in the Bahamas
List of hospitals in Barbados
List of hospitals in Belize
List of hospitals in Canada
List of hospitals in Costa Rica
List of hospitals in Cuba
List of hospitals in Dominica
List of hospitals in the Dominican Republic
List of hospitals in El Salvador
List of hospitals in Grenada
List of hospitals in Guatemala
List of hospitals in Haiti
List of hospitals in Honduras
List of hospitals in Jamaica
List of hospitals in Mexico
List of hospitals in Nicaragua
List of hospitals in Panama
List of hospitals in Saint Kitts and Nevis
List of hospitals in Saint Lucia
List of hospitals in Saint Vincent and the Grenadines
List of hospitals in Trinidad and Tobago
Cauro Hospital, St. Augustine
 Eric Williams Medical Sciences Complex, Champ Fleurs
 Mt.hope General Hospital (Women's Hospital), Champ Fleurs
 Point Fortin Area Hospital, Point Fortin
 Port of Spain General Hospital, Port of Spain
 San Fernando General Hospital, San Fernando
 Sangre Grande General Hospital, Sangre Grande
Scarborough General Hospital, Tobago
Saint Anne's Hospital (Mental), Saint Anne's
Lists of hospitals in the United States

Territories and dependencies
The following lists shows the country, list or number of hospitals, and number of hospitals in the country category:
Anguilla has one hospital, the Princess Alexandra Hospital, Anguilla
Aruba has one hospital, the Dr. Horacio E. Oduber Hospital.
Bermuda, List of hospitals in Bermuda
Bonaire has one hospital, the Hospital San Francisco.
British Virgin Islands
Cayman Islands, List of hospitals in the Cayman Islands
Curaçao has one hospital, the Curaçao Medical Center.
Greenland List of hospitals in Greenland
Guadeloupe
Martinique
Montserrat has one small hospital (Glendon Hospital), however specialised health care has to be performed in Antigua or Guadeloupe.
Puerto Rico List of hospitals in Puerto Rico
Saba has one small health center (A.M. Edwards Medical Center), however specialised health care has to be performed in Sint Maarten Medical Center.
Saint Barthélemy has one small hospital (Hôpital de Bruyn), however specialised health care has to be performed in Guadeloupe.
Saint Martin has one hospital, the Louis-Constant Fleming Hospital.
Saint Pierre and Miquelon has one small hospital (Centre Hospitalier François Dunan), however specialised health care has to be performed in St. John's, Newfoundland and Labrador.
Sint Eustatius has one small hospital (Queen Beatrix Medical Center), however specialised health care has to be performed in Sint Maarten Medical Center.
Sint Maarten has one hospital, the Sint Maarten Medical Center.
Turks and Caicos Islands: There are two hospitals in Turks and Caicos Islands.
National Hospital Grand Turk, Grand Turk, 10 beds.
National Hospital Providenciales, Providenciales, 20 beds.
United States Virgin Islands:  There are two hospitals in the U.S. Virgin Islands
Gov. Juan F. Luis Hospital Medical Center, Christiansted, 77 beds
Roy Lester Schneider Hospital, Saint Thomas, 107 beds

See also
Lists of hospitals
Lists of hospitals in Africa
Lists of hospitals in Asia
Lists of hospitals in Europe
Lists of hospitals in Oceania
Lists of hospitals in South America

References

 
North America-related lists